The Edgefield Advertiser is a newspaper in South Carolina, published continuously under the same nameplate since February 11, 1836. It is published in Edgefield, South Carolina.  Throughout its history, the newspaper has not been afraid to take unpopular stands, even coming out strongly against Edgefield-born U.S. Senator Strom Thurmond.
 
William Walton Mims was the editor of the paper from 1937 to 2002. His daughter, Suzanne Gile Mims Derrick, assumed editorship on January 1, 2003. She is currently the owner, publisher, and editor-in-chief. Currently under the direction of Mrs Derrick the paper is serving all facets of the diverse community that make up its readership.

References

External links
 Newspaper website

Newspapers published in South Carolina